Panx Romana is a Greek punk rock band that was established in 1977. They are very popular among Greek anarchists and have done multiple concerts in many locations of Athens. They have also performed many well known songs such as Διακοπές στο Χακί (Diakopes sto Chaki) "Vacation while wearing Khaki (lit. in Khaki)", Ράδιο Κατάληψη (Radio Katalipsi) "Radio Occupation", Το Γράμμα (To Gramma) "The Letter", and Το Μυστικό Πάρτυ (To mystiko party) "The Secret Party".

Band members
 Frank: vocals, lyrics
 Woody: guitar
 Δημήτρης Δημητράκας (Dimitris Dimitrakas): drums
 Χρήστος Αθανασάκος (Christos Athanasakos): Μουσική: bass

Discography
Παιδιά στα όπλα (Paidia Sta Opla) "Kids to Arms" (1987)
Αντάρτες πόλεων (Andartes Poleon) "Urban Guerillas" (1989)
Σπάσε τη γραμμή (Spase ti Grammi) "Break the Line" (1993)
Διαγωγή Κοσμία (EP) (Diagogi Kosmia) "Decent Demeanor" (1996) 
Κράτος κλειστόν (Kratos Kleiston) "State: Closed" (1999)

References
 Λάσκαρις, Μπάμπης (Laskaris, Bambis) et al.., ed. ΟΞΥ, March 2007 (in Greek).

External links
Panx Romana - Official website (in Greek)
Dimitrakas' official website (in Greek)

Anarcho-punk groups
Greek punk rock groups